Robert Archambeau (born 1968) is a poet and literary critic  whose works include the books Citation Suite, Home and Variations Laureates and Heretics, The Poet Resigns: Poetry in a Difficult World, The Kafka Sutra and Inventions of a Barbarous Age: Poetry from Conceptualism to Rhyme. He has also edited a number of works, including Word Play Place: Essays on the Poetry of John Matthias, The &NOW Awards: The Best Innovative Writing, and Letters of Blood: English Writings of Göran Printz-Påhlson. Along with John Matthias he is the co-author of Revolutions: A Collaboration, a collection of prose and poetry with images by the artist Jean Dibble.

Son of Canadian ceramic artist, Robert Archambeau, Robert Archambeau was born in Providence, Rhode Island and raised in Winnipeg, Manitoba. He teaches English as a professor at Lake Forest College near Chicago.

His recent work explores the social context of the history of poetics: he has been called "our smartest poetic sociologist" in the scholarly journal Contemporary Literature.

In 2001, he ran an election on the POETICS list as a protest against the appointment of Billy Collins as Poet Laureate Consultant in Poetry to the Library of Congress.  Anselm Hollo was elected to the honorary position.

He has received grants and awards from the Academy of American Poets, the Illinois Arts Council, and the Swedish Academy.

Slate magazine listed his book The Poet Resigns as one of the most underrated books of 2013.

Along with R.S. Gwynn he chairs the Poets' Prize committee.

Notes and references

External links 
 Samizdat Blog
 The Argotist Online: Robert Archambeau Interview
 Critical Margins interview with Robert Archambeau
 Salt Publishing Author Page
 Poetry Foundation Biography
 Poetry Foundation Biography
 University of ND Press: Laureates and Heretics
 Open Book: Letters of Blood
 Robert Archambeau at Ohio University Press
 Review of Home and Variations in the Notre Dame Review
 Review of Home and Variations in PN Review
 Review of Laureates and Heretics in PN Review
 Review of Laureates and Heretics in Contemporary Literature
 The Anti-Laureate Announcement

1968 births
American literary critics
Poets from Rhode Island
Lake Forest College faculty
Living people
21st-century American poets